Telma Raquel Velosa Encarnação (born 11 October 2001) is a Portuguese footballer who plays as a forward for Marítimo. She has appeared for the Portugal women's national team.

Club career
In May 2018, Encarnação scored in Marítimo's 6–0 win over Clube Condeixa which secured the club's promotion to the top-flight Campeonato Nacional Feminino for the first time. After becoming a key player she agreed a new three-year contract with Marítimo in March 2021, prolonging her stay at the Funchal club she joined as a 13-year-old from ADRC Os Xavelhas in nearby Câmara de Lobos.

International career
On 10 November 2018 Encarnação won her first senior cap for Portugal in a 1–0 friendly win over Wales in Rio Maior. She entered play as a 59th-minute substitute for fellow Madeiran Laura Luís.

International goals

References

External links
 
 

2001 births
Living people
Portuguese women's footballers
Portugal women's international footballers
Women's association football defenders
Campeonato Nacional de Futebol Feminino players
People from Câmara de Lobos
Sportspeople from Funchal
UEFA Women's Euro 2022 players